The national pavilions host each participant nation's official representation during the Venice Biennale, an international art biennial exhibition held in Venice, Italy. Some countries own pavilion buildings in the Giardini della Biennale while others rent buildings throughout the city, but each country controls its own selection process and production costs.

Background 
The Venice Biennale is an international art biennial exhibition held in Venice, Italy. Often described as "the Olympics of the art world", participation in the Biennale is a prestigious event for contemporary artists. The festival has become a constellation of shows: a central exhibition curated by that year's artistic director, national pavilions hosted by individual nations, and independent exhibitions throughout Venice. The Biennale parent organization also hosts regular festivals in other arts: architecture, dance, film, music, and theater.

Outside of the central, international exhibition, individual nations produce their own shows, known as pavilions, as their national representation. Nations that own their pavilion buildings, such as the 30 housed on the Giardini, are responsible for their own upkeep and construction costs as well. Nations without dedicated buildings create pavilions in venues throughout the city.

Giardini national pavilions

Pavilions outside Giardini

Albania
List of exhibitors in the Albanian Pavilion:
 1999 — Alban Hajdinaj, Besnik & Flutura Haxhillari, Edi Hila, Lala Meredith-Vula, Gazmend Muka, Adrian Paci, Edi Rama, Anri Sala, Astrit Vatnikaj, Sislej Xhafa. (Curator: Edi Muka)
 2005 — Sislej Xhafa. (Commissioner and Curator: Andi Tepelena and Cecilia Tirelli)
 2007 — Helidon Gjergji, Genti Gjokola, Alban Hajdinaj, Armando Lulaj, Heldi Pema. (Commissioner: Rubens Shima. Curator: Bonnie Clearwater)
 2009 — Anila Rubiku, Orion Shima, Gentian Shkurti, Eltjon Valle, Driant Zeneli. (Commissioner: Parid Tefereçi. Curator: Riccardo Caldura)
 2015 — Armando Lulaj. (Curator: Marco Scotini)
 2017 — Leonard Qylafi. (Curator: Vanessa Joan Müller)

Argentina
In 1901, Argentina was the first Latin American nation to participate in the Biennale. In 2011, it was granted a pavilion in the Sale d'Armi, which it will restore.

List of exhibitors in the Argentine Pavilion:
 1903 — Pío Collivadino
 1905 — Pío Collivadino
 1907 — Pío Collivadino
 1954 — Lucio Fontana
 1956 — Sarah Grilo
 1958 — Lucio Fontana, Juan del Prete, Raquel Forner
 1962 — Antonio Berni
 1966 — Lucio Fontana, Julio Le Parc
 1968 — Lucio Fontana, Nicolás García Uriburu
 1970 — Luis Fernando Benedit
 1972 — Lucio Fontana
 1978 — Lucio Fontana
 1980 — Sergio de Castro, Fabriciano
 1982 — Marino di Teana
 1984 — Antonio Seguí
 1986 — Marta Minujin
 1995 — Jorge Orta
 1997 — Ana Eckell
 1999 — Jaques Bedel, Luis Benedit, Oscar Bony
 2001 — Leandro Erlich, Graciela Sacco (Curator: Irma Arestizábal)
 2003 — Charly Nijensohn
 2005 — Jorge Macchi, Edgardo Rudnitzky
 2007 — Guillermo Kuitca, Jorge Macchi, Edgardo Rudnitzky (Commissioner: Adriana Rosenberg)
 2009 — Luis Felipe Noé (Curator: Fabián Lebenglik)
 2011 — Adrián Villar Rojas (Curator: Rodrigo Alonso)
 2013 — Nicola Costantino (Curator: Fernando Farina)
 2015 — Juan Carlos Distéfano (Curator: María Teresa Constantín)
 2017 — Claudia Fontes (Curator: Christine Macel)
 2019 — Mariana Telleria (Curator: Florencia Battini)

Bosnia and Herzegovina 
List of exhibitors in the Bosnian Pavilion:

 2003 — Maja Bajevic, Jusuf Hadžifejzovic, Edin Numankadic, Nebojša Šeric-Šoba 
 2013 — Mlаden Miljаnović
 2017 — Radenko Milak (Curators : Christopher Yggdre, Sinziana Ravini, Fredrik Svensk, Anna van der Vliet) 
 2019 — Danica Dakić (Curators: Anja Bogojević, Amila Puzić, Claudia Zini)

Central Asia
The first Central Asian Pavilion was an initiative of Victor Miziano in 2005. The second pavilion was organized by Yulia Sorokina (Almaty) and the third by Beral Madra (Istanbul). Each of these was different in format and approach. The first one – Art from Central Asia. A Contemporary Archive – aimed at placing Central Asia on the 'map' of international art. Along the works of invited artists, there were many video compilations of films, performance and happenings presented by Central Asian artists from the end of the 1990s and beginning of 2000.

List of exhibitors in the Central Asia Pavilion:
 2005 — Said Atabekov, Vyacheslav Akhunov & Sergey Tychina, Maksim Boronilov & Roman Maskalev, Elena Vorobyeva & Viktor Vorobyev, Kasmalieva & Djumaliev, Sergey Maslov, Almagul Menlibaeva, Erbossyn Meldibekov, Alexander Nikolaev, Rustam Khalfin & Yulia Tikhonova (Curators: Viktor Misiano, Commissioner: Churek Djamgerchinova)
 2007 — Roman Maskalev, Almagul Menlibaeva & German Popov, Gulnur Mukazhanova, Alexander Nikolaev, Aleksey Rumyantsev, Alexander Ugay, Asia Animation, Said Atabekov, Vyacheslav Akhunov, Alla Girik & Oksana Shatalova, Digsys, Natalia Dyu, Zadarnovsky Brothers, Gaukhar Kiyekbayeva, Vyacheslav Useinov, Jamol Usmanov, Aytegin Muratbek Uulu, Jamshed Kholikov, ZITABL (Commissioner and curator: Yulia Sorokina)
 2009 — Ermek Jaenish, Jamshed Kholikov, Anzor Salidjanov, Oksana Shatalova, Elena Vorobyeva & Viktor Vorobyev (Curator: Beral Madra, Commissioner: Vittorio Urbani)
 2011 — Natalia Andrianova, Said Atabekov, Artyom Ernst, Galim Madanov and Zauresh Terekbay, Yerbossyn Meldibekov, Alexander Nikolaev, Marat Raiymkulov, Aleksey Rumyantsev and Alla Rumyantseva, Adis Seitaliev (Curators: Boris Chukhovich, Georgy Mamedov, Oksana Shatalova, Commissioners: Asel Akmatova, Andris Brinkmanis)

Chile
List of exhibitors in the Chilean Pavilion:
 2009 — Iván Navarro (Curators: Antonio Arévalo, Justo Pastor Mellado)
 2011 — Fernando Prats (Curator: Fernando Castro Flórez)
 2013 — Alfredo Jaar (Curator: Madeleine Grynsztejn)
 2015 — Paz Errázuriz, Lotty Rosenfeld (Curator: Nelly Richard)
 2017 — Bernardo Oyarzún (Curator: Ticio Escobar)

Croatia
List of exhibitors in the Croatian Pavilion:
 1993 — Milivoj Bijelić, Ivo Deković, and Željko Kipke
 1995 — Martina Kramer, Goran Petercol, Mirko Zrinščak, Ivan Faktor, Nina Ivančić, Damir Sokić, Mladen Stilinović, Dean Jokanović Toumin, Goran Trbuljak, Gorki Žanić
 1997 — Dalibor Martinis
 1999 — Zlatan Vrkljan
 2001 — Julije Knifer
 2003 — Boris Cvjetanović and Ana Opalić
 2007 — Ivana Franke (curator: Branko Franceschi, Željko Kipke)
 2010 — Saša Begović, Marko Dabrović, Igor Franić, Tanja Grozdanić, Petar Mišković, Silvije Novak, Veljko Oluić, Helena Paver Njirić, Lea Pelivan, Toma Plejić, Goran Rako, Saša Randić, Turato Idis, Pero Vuković e Tonči Žarnić
 2013 — Kata Mijatović (Curator: Branko Franceschi)
 2015 — Damir Očko (Curator: Marc Bembekoff)
 2017 — Tina Gverović, Marko Tadić (Curator: Branka Benčić)
 2019 — Igor Grubić (Curator: Katerina Gregos)

Estonia
The expositions at the Estonian pavilion are regularly commissioned by the Estonian Centre for Contemporary Art.

List of exhibitors in the Estonian pavilion:
 2003 — Kaido Ole
 2005 — Mark Raidpere (Curator: Hanno Soans)
 2007 — Marko Mäetamm (Curator: Mika Hannula)
 2009 — Kristina Norman (Curator: Marko Laimre)
 2011 — Liina Siib
 2013 — Dénes Farkas
 2015 — Jaanus Samma (Curator: Eugenio Viola)
 2017 — Katja Novitskova (Curator: Kati Ilves)
 2019 — Kris Lemsalu
 2022 — Kristina Norman, Bita Razavi, Emilie Rosalie Saal (Curator: Corina L. Apostol)

Gabon 
Gabon first participated in the Venice Biennale in 2009.

List of exhibitors in the Gabonese Pavilion:
 2009 — Owanto (Curator: Fernando Frances)

Georgia
List of exhibitors in the Georgian Pavilion:
 2009 — Koka Ramishvili (Curator: Khatuna Khabuliani)
 2013 — Bouillon Group, Thea Djordjadze, Nikoloz Lutidze, Gela Patashuri with Ei Arakawa and Sergei Tcherepnin, Gio Sumbadze (Commissioner: Marine Mizandari, curator: Joanna Warsza)
 2015 — Rusudan Khizanishvili, Irakli Bluishvili, Dimitri Chikvaidze, Joseph Sabia, Ia Liparteliani, Nia Mgaloblishvili, Sophio Shevardnadze (Curator: Nia Mgaloblishvili)
 2017 — Vajiko Chachkhiani (Curator: Julian Heynen)
 2019 — Anna K.E. (Curator: Margot Norton)

Ghana
In 2019, Ghana will officially participate in the Venice Biennale for the first time.

List of exhibitors in the Ghanaian Pavilion:
 2019 — El Anatsui, Ibrahim Mahama, Felicia Abban, Lynette Yiadom-Boakye, John Akomfrah, Selasi Awusi Sosu (Curator: Nana Oforiatta Ayim)

Grenada 
In 2017, Grenada participated in the Venice Biennale at an exclusive space in Zattere, Dorsoduro, all allocated for the exhibition entitled The Bridge, where international artists from nations with sea outlets explored the collective idea of "own identity".

 2017 —  Alexandre Murucci, Khaled Hafez, Jason de Caires Taylor, Asher Mains, Milton Williams, Rashid Al Kahlifa, Zena Assi and Mahmoud Obaidi (Curator: Omar Donia)

Hong Kong
List of exhibitors in the Hong Kong Pavilion:
 2009 — Pak Sheung Chuen (Curator: Tobias Berger)
 2011 — Kwok Mang Ho (known as Frog King) 
 2013 — Lee Kit (Curators: Lars Nittve, Yung Ma)
 2015 — Tsang Kin-wah (Curators: Doryun Chong, Stella Fong)
 2017 — Samson Young (Curator: Ying Kwok)
 2019 — Shirley Tse (Curator: Christina Li)
2022 — Angela Su (Curator: Freya Chou)

Holy See
 2013 — Studio Azzurro, Lawrence Carroll, Josef Koudelka
 2015 — Monika Bravo, Elpida Hadzi-Vasileva, Mário Macilau (Curator: Micol Forti)

Iceland
In 1984, as Finland had joined Norway and Sweden in the Nordic Pavilion, Iceland was given the opportunity to rent the Finnish pavilion until 2006. The Icelandic Art Center commissions the Icelandic Pavilion at the Venice Biennale.

List of exhibitors in the Icelandish Pavilion:
 1960 — Jóhannes Sveinsson Kjarval, Ásmundur Sveinsson
 1972 — Svavar Guðnason, Þorvaldur Skúlason 
 1980 — Magnús Pálsson
 1982 — Jón Gunnar Árnason, Kristján Guðmundsson
 1984 — Kristján Davidsson
 1986 — Erró
 1988 — Gunnar Örn
 1990 — Helgi Þorgils Friðjónsson
 1995 — Birgir Andrésson
 1997 — Steina Vasulka
 1999 — Sigurður Árni Sigurðsson
 2001 — Finnbogi Pétursson
 2003 — Rúrí
 2005 — Gabríela Friðriksdóttir
 2007 — Steingrímur Eyfjörð (Curator: Hanna Styrmisdóttir)
 2009 — Ragnar Kjartansson (Curators: Markús Thór Andrésson, Dorothée Kirch)
 2011 — Libia Castro & Ólafur Ólafsson (Curator: Ellen Blumenstein)
 2013 — Katrín Sigurðardóttir (Curators: Mary Ceruti, Ilaria Bonacossa)
 2015 — Christoph Büchel (Curator: Nína Magnúsdóttir)
 2017 — Egill Sæbjörnsson (Curator: Stefanie Böttcher)
 2019 - Shoplifter - born Hrafnhildur Arnardóttir (Curator: Birta Gudjónsdóttir)

India
In 2011, India was represented for the first time after 116 years, with the support of the culture ministry and the organizational participation of the Lalit Kala Akademi. Biennale organizers had reportedly invited the country in past years, but the government had declined, a decision attributed to a lack of communication between the culture ministry and the country's National Gallery of Modern Art.
 2011 — Mriganka Madhukaliya, Sonal Jain, Zarina Hashmi, Gigi Scaria, Praneet Soi (Curator: Ranjit Hoskote)
 2015 — Shilpa Gupta, Rashid Rana (Exhibition jointly held with Pakistan)
 2019 — Nandalal Bose, Atul Dodiya, Rummana Hussain, GR Iranna, Jitish Kallat, Shakuntala Kulkarni, Ashim Purkayastha

Indonesia 
List of exhibitors in the Indonesian Pavilion:

 2003: Arahmaiani , Dadang Christanto, Tisna Sanjaya, Made Wianta (Curator: Amir Sidharta)
 2005: Krisna Murti, Noor Ibrahim, Entang Wiharso, and Yani Mariani Sastranegara (Curator: Dwi Marianto)
 2013: Albert Yonathan Setyawan, Sri Astari, Eko Nugroho, Entang Wiharso, and Titarubi (Curators: Carla Bianpoen and Rifky Effendy)
 2015: Heri Dono (Curators: Carla Bianpoen, Restu Imansari Kusumaningrum, and Asmudjo Jono Irianto)
 2017: Tintin Wulia (Curator: Agung Hujatnikajennong)
 2019: Handiwirman Saputra and Syagini Ratna Wulan (Curator: Asmudjo Jono Irianto)

Iran
 1958 - Monir Shahroudy Farmanfarmaian
 2003 - Behrouz Daresh, Hossein KhoroJerdi, and Ahmad Nadalian
 2015 - Furat al Jamil (b. 1965), Lida Abdul, Bani Abidi, Adel Abidin, Amin Agheai, Ghodratollah Agheli, Shahriar Ahmadi, Parastou Ahovan, Farhad Ahrarnia, Rashad Alakbarov, Nazgol Ansarinia, Reza Aramesh, Alireza Astaneh, Sonia Balassanian, Mahmoud Bakhshi Moakhar, Wafaa Bilal, Mehdi Farhadian, Shadi Ghadirian, Shilpa Gupta, Ghasem Hajizadeh, Shamsia Hassani, Sahand Hesamiyan, Sitara Ibrahimova, Pouran Jinchi, Amar Kanwar, Babak Kazemi, Ryas Komu, Farideh Lashai, Farokh Mahdavi, Ahmad Morshedloo, Mehrdad Mohebali, Huma Mulji, Azad Nanakeli, Jamal Penjweny, Imran Qureshi, Sara Rahbar, Rashid Rana, Atefeh Samaei, T. V. Santhosh, Walid Siti, Monir Shahroudy Farmanfarmaian, Mohsen Taasha Wahidi, Mitra Tabrizian, Parviz Tanavoli, Newsha Tavakolian, Sadegh Tirafkan, Hema Upadhyay, Saira Wasim
 2017 - Bizhan Bassiri
 2019 - Samira Alikhanza, Ali Mir-Azimi, and Reza Lavasani

Iraq
In 2011, Iraq returned to the Biennale for the first time after a 35-year absence. The title of the Iraq Pavilion was "Acqua Ferita" (translated as "Wounded Water"). Six Iraqi artists from two generations interpreted the theme of water in their works, which made up the exhibition. 
 2011 — Adel Abidin, Halim Al Karim, Ahmed Alsoudani, Ali Assaf, Azad Nanakeli, Walid Siti
 2013 — 'Welcome to Iraq', curated by Jonathan Watkins, commissioned by Ruya Foundation. Artists: Abdul Raheem Yassir (b. 1951), Akeel Khreef (b. 1979), Ali Samiaa (b. 1980), Bassim Al-Shaker (b. 1986), Cheeman Ismaeel (b. 1966), Furat al Jamil (b. 1965), Hareth Alhomaam (b. 1987), Jamal Penjweny (b. 1981), Kadhim Nwir (b. 1967), Yaseen Wami (b. 1973), Hashim Taeeh.
 2015 — 'Invisible Beauty', curated by Philippe Van Cauteren, commissioned by Ruya Foundation. Artists:  Latif Al Ani, Akam Shex Hadi, Rabab Ghazoul, Salam Atta Sabri and Haider Jabbar.
 2017 — 'Archaic', curated by Tamara Chalabi and Paolo Colombo, commissioned by Ruya Foundation. Artists: Sherko Abbas, Sadik Kwaish Alfraji, Francis Alÿs, Ali Arkady, Luary Fadhil, Shakir Hassan Al Said, Nadine Hattom, Jawad Saleem, Sakar Sleman
 2019 — 'Fatherland: Serwan Baran', curated by Tamara Chalabi and Paolo Colombo, commissioned by Ruya Foundation. Artist: Serwan Baran (b. 1968).

Ireland
List of exhibitors in the Irish Pavilion:
 1950 — Norah McGuinness, Nano Reid
 1956 — Louis le Brocquy, Hilary Heron
 1960 — Patrick Scott
 1993 — Dorothy Cross, Willie Doherty
 1995 — Kathy Prendergast
 1997 — Jaki Irvine, Alastair MacLennan
 1999 — Anne Tallentire
 2001 — Siobhan Hapaska, Grace Weir
 2003 — Katie Holten (Commissioner: Valerie Connor)
 2005 — Stephen Brandes, Mark Garry, Ronan McCrea, Isabel Nolan, Sarah Pierce, Walker and Walker (Commissioner: Sarah Glennie)
 2007 — Gerard Byrne (Commissioner: Mike Fitzpatrick)
 2009 — Sarah Browne, Gareth Kennedy, Kennedy Browne
 2011 — Corban Walker (Commissioner: Emily-Jane Kirwan)
 2013 — Richard Mosse (Commissioner: Anna O'Sullivan)
 2015 — Sean Lynch, The Rubberbandits (Commissioner: Mike Fitzpatrick; curator: Woodrow Kernohan)
 2017 — Jesse Jones, Olwen Fouéré (Curator: Tessa Giblin)
 2019 — Eva Rothschild (Curator: Mary Cremin)
 2022 — Niamh O'Malley (Curator: Temple Bar Gallery & Studios)

Italy
"Palazzo Pro Arte": Enrico Trevisanato, façade by Marius De Maria and Bartholomeo Bezzi, 1895; new façade by Guido Cirilli, 1914; "Padiglione Italia", present façade by Duilio Torres, 1932. The pavilion has a sculpture garden by Carlo Scarpa, 1952 and the "Auditorium Pastor" by Valeriano Pastor, 1977.

Partial list of exhibitors at the Italian Pavilion:

 1895 — Giuseppe Ferrari
 1905 — Giuseppe Ferrari
 1912 — Aldo Carpi
 1922 — Giuseppe Ferrari (posthumus)
 1934 — Aldo Carpi, Carlo Martini
 1936 — Aldo Carpi, Carlo Martini, Quinto Martini
 1942 — Aldo Carpi, Trento Longaretti
 1948 — Aldo Carpi, Trento Longaretti, Carlo Martini
 1950 — Aldo Carpi, Trento Longaretti, Carlo Martini
 1966 — Ferruccio Bortoluzzi, Trento Longaretti
 1968 — Valerio Adami, Rodolfo Aricò, Gianni Bertini, Arturo Bonfanti, Gianni Colombo, Mario Deluigi, Gianfranco Ferroni, Luciano Gaspari,  Lorenzo Guerrini, Giovanni Korompay, Leoncillo Leonardi, Carlo Mattioli, Livio Marzot, Mirko, Marcello Morandini, Mario Nigro, Gino Morandis, Pino Pascali, Gastone Novelli, Achille Perilli, Michelangelo Pistoletto, Tancredi, Guido Strazza, Giacomo Porzano
 1984 — Roberto Barni, Alberto Burri, Enrico Castellani, Mario Ceroli, Sandro Chia, Giorgio de Chirico, Luciano Fabro, Tano Festa, Carlo Maria Mariani, Gino Marotta, Titina Maselli, Luigi Ontani, Giulio Paolini, Claudio Parmiggiani, Vettor Pisani, Michelangelo Pistoletto, Giò Pomodoro, Mario Schifano, Toti Scialoja, Massimo Scolari, Giuseppe Uncini, Luigi Nono (Curator: Maurizio Calvesi)
 1986 — Getulio Alviani, Giovanni Anselmo, Marco Bagnoli, Toni Benetton, Alighiero Boetti, Paolo Borghi, Francesco Borromini, Nicola Carrino, Claudio Costa, Sergio Dangelo, Giorgio de Chirico, Luciano Fabro, Piero Fogliati, Lucio Fontana, Alberto Giacometti, Piero Manzoni, Fausto Melotti, Mario Merz, Maurizio Mochetti, Luigi Ontani, Mimmo Paladino, Giulio Paolini, Claudio Parmiggiani, Pino Pascali, Luca Patella, Giuseppe Penone, Attilio Pierelli, Vettor Pisani, Michelangelo Pistoletto, Fabrizio Plessi, Enrico Prampolini, Alberto Savinio, Paolo Tessari, Emilio Vedova, Gilberto Zorio (Curator: Maurizio Calvesi)
 1988 — Carla Accardi, Roberto Barni, Alberto Burri, Andrea Cascella, Antonio Catelani, Mario Ceroli, Sandro Chia, Eduardo Chillida, Francesco Clemente, Enzo Cucchi, Daniela De Lorenzo, Piero Dorazio, Carlo Guaita, Felice Levini, Eliseo Mattiacci, Marisa Merz, Maurizio Mochetti, Ennio Morlotti, Mimmo Paladino, Maurizio Pellegrin, Alfredo Pirri, Arnaldo Pomodoro, Giò Pomodoro, Renato Ranaldi, Giuseppe Santomaso, Susana Solano, Alberto Viani (Curator: Giovanni Carandente)
 1990 — Davide Benati, Gino De Dominicis, Nicola De Maria, Luigi Mainolfi, Giuseppe Maraniello, Carlo Maria Mariani, Claudio Olivieri (Curators: Laura Cherubini, Flaminio Gualdoni, Lea Vergine)
 1993 — Francesco Clemente, Luciano Fabbro, Sergio Fermariello, Emilio Isgrò, Fabio Mauri, Eugenio Miccini, Hidetoshi Nagasawa, Luisa Protti, Sergio Sarra, Franco Vaccari (Curator: Achille Bonito Oliva)
 1995 — Lorenzo Bonechi, Ida Cadorin Barbarigo, Roberto Capucci, Francesco Clemente, Amalia Del Ponte, Stefano Di Stasio, Paolo Gallerani, Paola Gandolfi, Nunzio, Luigi Ontani, Claudio Parmiggiani, Gianni Pisani, Pier Luigi Pizzi, Angelo Savelli, Ruggero Savino, Ettore Spalletti, Vito Tongiani, Mino Trafeli, Giuliano Vangi (Curator: Jean Clair)
 1997 — Maurizio Cattelan, Enzo Cucchi, Ettore Spalletti (Curator: Germano Celant)
 1999 — Monica Bonvicini, Bruna Esposito, Luisa Lambri, Paola Pivi, Grazia Toderi (Curator: Harald Szeemann)
 2001 — Alighiero Boetti, Barry McGee, Todd James, Steve Powers (Curators: Pio Baldi, Paolo Colombo, Sandra Pinto)
 2003 — Charles Avery, Avish Khebrehzadeh, Sara Rossi, Carola Spadoni (Curators: Pio Baldi, Monica Pignatti Morano and Paolo Colombo). A12, Alessandra Ariatti, Micol Assaël, Diego Perrone, Patrick Tuttofuoco, Zimmer Frei (curator: Massimiliano Gioni)
 2005 — Carolina Antich, Manfredi Beninati, Loris Cecchini, Lara Favaretto (Curators: Pio Baldi, Monica Pignatti Morano and Paolo Colombo)
 2007 — Giuseppe Penone, Francesco Vezzoli (Curator: Ida Gianelli)
 2009 — Matteo Basilé, Manfredi Beninati, Valerio Berruti, Bertozzi & Casoni, Nicola Bolla, Sandro Chia, Marco Cingolani, Giacomo Costa, Aron Demetz, Roberto Floreani, Daniele Galliano, Marco Lodola, MASBEDO, Gian Marco Montesano, Davide Nido, Luca Pignatelli, Elisa Sighicelli, Sissi, Nicola Verlato, Silvio Wolf (Curators: Luca Beatrice and Beatrice Buscaroli)
 2011 — L'Arte non è Cosa Nostra, a group show with 250 artists, including Valerio Adami, Vanessa Beecroft, Agostino Bonalumi, Enzo Cucchi, Roberto Ferri, Silvio Formichetti, Michelangelo Pistoletto, Rabarama and Oliviero Toscani (Curator: Vittorio Sgarbi)
 2013 — Francesco Arena, Massimo Bartolini, Gianfranco Baruchello, Elisabetta Benassi, Flavio Favelli, Luigi Ghirri, Piero Golia, Francesca Grilli, Marcello Maloberti, Fabio Mauri, Giulio Paolini, Marco Tirelli, Luca Vitone, Sislej Xhafa (Curator: Bartolomeo Pietromarchi)
 2015 — Alis/Filliol, Andrea Aquilanti, Francesco Barocco, Vanessa Beecroft, Antonio Biasiucci, Giuseppe Caccavale, Paolo Gioli, Jannis Kounellis , Nino Longobardi, Marzia Migliora, Luca Monterastelli, Mimmo Paladino, Claudio Parmeggiani, Nicola Samorì, Aldo Tambellini (Curator: Vincenzo Trione)
 2017 — Giorgio Andreotta Calò, Roberto Cuoghi, Adelita Husni-Bey (Curator: Cecilia Alemani)
 2019 — Enrico David, Chiara Fumai, Liliana Moro (Curator: Milovan Farronato)
 2021 – Gian Maria Tosatti  (Curator: Eugenio Viola)

Republic of Kazakhstan
List of exhibitors and curators in the Kazakhstan Pavilion:
 2022 — ORTA Collective: Alexandra Morozova, Rustem Begenov, Darya Jumelya, Alexandr Bakanov, Sabina Kuangaliyeva. (Curator: ORTA Collective, Commissioner: Meruyert Kaliyeva)

Republic of Kosovo
List of exhibitors in the Kosovo Pavilion:
 2013 — Petrit Halilaj (Curator: Kathrin Rhomberg. Commissioner: Erzen Shkololli)
 2015 — Flaka Haliti (Curator: Nicolaus Schafhausen)
 2017 — Sislej Xhafa (Curator: Arta Agani, Commissioner: Valon Ibraj)
 2019 — Alban Muja (Curator: Vincent Honoré)

Kuwait
List of exhibitors in the Kuwait Pavilion:
 2013 — "National Works" featuring works by Sami Mohammad and Tarek Al-Ghoussein (Curator: Ala Younis, Commissioner: National Council for Culture, Arts and Letters)

Lebanon
Lebanon was present at the Biennale for the first time in 2007.
After being absent in 2009 and 2011, it is coming back in 2013.

 2007 — Foreword: Fouad Elkoury, Lamia Joreige, Walid Sadek, Mounira Al Solh and Akram Zaatari (Curators: Saleh Barakat, Sandra Dagher)
 2013 — Akram Zaatari (Curators: Sam Bardaouil, Till Fellrath)
 2017 — Zad Moultaka (Curator: Emmanuel Daydé)

Latvia
List of exhibitors in the Latvian Pavilion:
 2001 — Laila Pakalniņa

Lithuania
List of exhibitors in the Lithuanian Pavilion:
 1999 — Mindaugas Navakas and Eglė Rakauskaitė
 2001 — Deimantas Narkevičius
 2003 — Svajonė Stanikas and Paulius Stanikas
 2005 — Jonas Mekas
 2007 — Nomeda Urbonienė and Gediminas Urbonas
 2009 — Žilvinas Kempinas
 2011 — Darius Mikšys
 2013 — Gintaras Didžiapetris, Elena Narbutaitė, Liudvikas Buklys, Kazys Varnelis, Vytautė Žilinskaitė, Morten Norbye Halvorsen, Jason Dodge, Gabriel Lester, Dexter Sinister (Curator: Raimundas Malašauskas)
 2015 — Dainius Liškevičius
 2017 — Žilvinas Landzbergas
 2019 — Rugilė Barzdžiukaitė, Vaiva Grainytė, Lina Lapelytė

Luxembourg
The Cà del Duca, situated on the Canale Grande, has been the permanent site for Luxembourg's participations in the Venice Biennale since 1999.

List of exhibitors in the Luxembourg Pavilion:
 1990 — Marie-Paule Feiereisen
 1993 — Jean-Marie Biwer, Bertrand Ney
 1995 — Bert Theis
 1997 — Luc Wolf
 1999 — Simone Decker
 2001 — Doris Drescher
 2003 — Su-Mei Tse
 2007 — Jill Mercedes
 2009 — Gast Bouschet, Nadine Hilbert
 2011 — Martine Feipel, Jean Bechameil (Curator: René Kockelkorn)
 2013 — Catherine Lorent
 2015 — Filip Markiewicz (Curator: Paul Ardenne)
 2017 — Mike Bourscheid (Curator: Kevin Muhlen)
 2019 — Marco Godinho

Macao
List of exhibitors in the Macao Pavilion:
 2015 — Mio Pang Fei

Maldives
The Maldives Pavilion was introduced in 2013.
List of exhibitors in the Maldives Pavilion:

 2013 — Mohamed Ali, Sama Alshaibi, Ursula Biemann, Stefano Cagol, Wael Darwesh, Moomin Fouad, Thierry Geoffrey (aka Colonel), Khaled Hafez, Heidrun Holzfeind & Christoph Draeger, Hanna Husberg, Laura McLean & Kalliopi Tsipni-Kolaza, Achilleas Kentonis & Maria Papacaharalambous, Paul Miller (aka DJ Spooky), Gregory Niemeyer, Khaled Ramada, Oliver Ressler, Klaus Schafler, Patrizio Travagli, Wooloo (Sixten Kai Nielsen and Martin Rosengaard), (Curators CPS – Chamber of Public Secrets: Alfredo Cramerotti, Aida Eltorie, Khaled Ramadan)

Malta
The Malta Pavilion returned to the Venice Biennale in 2017. They also exhibited in 2000 and 1958. List of exhibitors in the Malta Pavilion:

 1958 — Carmelo Mangion, Antoine Camilleri, Emvin Cremona, Frank Portelli, Josef Kalleya
 1999 — Vince Briffa, Norbert Francis Attard, Ray Pitre (Curator: Adrian Bartolo)
 2017 — Adrian Abela, John Paul Azzopardi, Aaron Bezzina, Pia Borg, Gilbert Calleja, Austin Camilleri, Roxman Gatt, David Pisani, Karine Rougier, Joe Sacco, Teresa Sciberras, Darren Tanti and Maurice Tanti Burlo’ and artefacts from Heritage Malta’s National collection, Ghaqda tal-Pawlini, private collections and various archives (Curators: Raphael Vella and Bettina Hutschek)
 2022 - Arcangelo Sassolino

Mauritius 
The Pavilion of Mauritius was introduced in 2015 with an exhibition ‘From One Citizen You Gather an Idea’. 
 2015 — Tania Antoshina, Djuneid Dulloo, Sultana Haukim, Nirmal Hurry, Alix Le Juge, Olga Jürgenson, Helge Leiberg, Krishna Luchoomun, Bik Van Der Pol, Vitaly Pushnitsky, Römer + Römer, Kavinash Thomoo (Curators: Olga Jürgenson, Alfredo Cramerotti, Commissioner: pARTage)
 2017 — Michael Lalljee, Robert Rauschenberg, SEO, Jacques Desiré, Wong So (Curator: Olga Jürgenson, Executor: Krishna Luchoomun, Commissioner: Thivynaidoo Perumal Naiken)

Mexico 
The Mexican Pavilion was introduced for the first time in 1950 with the participation of the Muralists: David Alfaro Siqueiros, Diego Rivera, José Clemente Orozco and Rufino Tamayo. For this participation, David Alfaro Siqueiros was awarded the 1st prize to foreign artists. The national participation was interrupted until 2007. The exhibitors that have represented the pavilion are:
 1950 — David Alfaro Siqueiros, Diego Rivera, José Clemente Orozco, Rufino Tamayo
 2007 — Rafael Lozano-Hemmer
 2009 — Teresa Margolles
 2011 — Melanie Smith
 2013 — Ariel Guzik
 2015 — Tania Candiani, Luis Felipe Ortega
 2017 — Carlos Amorales (Curator: Pablo León De La Barra)

Mongolia 

Names of exhibitions, exhibitors, curators and organizers of the Mongolia Pavilion:
 2015 — Other Home. Artists Unen Enkh and Enkhbold Togmidshiirev, Commissioner Gantuya Badamgarav, Curator Uranchimeg Tsultem and Organizer Mongolian Contemporary Art Support Association
 2017 — Lost in Tngri. Artists Chimeddorj Shagdarjav, Enkhtaivan Ochirbat, Munkkh - Munkhbolor Ganbold, Davaajargal Tsaschikher, Bolortuvshin Jargalsainkhan, Commissioner Munkh-Orgil Tsend, Project Director Gantuya Badamgarav, Curator Dalkh-Ochir Yondonjunai and Organizer Mongolian Contemporary Art Support Association
 2019  — A Temporality. Artist Jantsankhorol Erdenebayar, with the participation of Mongolian throat singers Ashit Nergui, Damdin Khadkhuu, Undarmaa Altangerel, Davaasuren Damjin and guest artist Carsten Nicolai. Curator Gantuya Badamgarav, co-curator Carsten Nicolai, Commissioner The Ministry of Education, Culture, Science and Sports of Mongolia and Organizer Mongolian Contemporary Art Support Association
 2022  — A Journey Through Vulnerability. Artist Munkhtsetseg Jalkhaajav. Curator Gantuya Badamgarav. Commissioner Nomin Chinbat, Minister of Culture.

New Zealand
List of exhibitors in the New Zealand Pavilion:
 2001 — Peter Robinson and Jacqueline Fraser (Curator: Gregory Burke)
 2003 — Michael Stevenson (Curators: Robert Leonard and Boris Kremer)
 2005 — et al. (Curator: Natasha Conland)
 2007 — Brett Graham and Frank Fu
 2009 — Judy Millar (Curator: Leonhard Emmerling) and Francis Upritchard (Curators: Heather Galbraith and Francesco Manacorda)
 2011 — Michael Parekowhai (Curator: Jenny Harper)
 2013 — Bill Culbert (Curator: Justin Paton)
 2015 — Simon Denny (Curator: Robert Leonard)
 2017 — Lisa Reihana (Curator: Rhana Devenport)
 2019 — Dane Mitchell (Curators: Chris Sharp and Zara Stanhope)
 2022 — Yuki Kihara (Curator: Natalie King)

North Macedonia
List of exhibitors in the Macedonian Pavilion:
 1993 — Gligor Stefanov and Petre Nikoloski
 1997 — Aneta Svetieva
 1999 — Iskra Dimitrova
 2001 — Javon Sumkovski
 2003 — Zaneta Bangeli and Vana Urosebic
 2005 — Antoni Maznevski
 2007 — Blagoja Manevski
 2009 — Nikola Uzunovski and Goce Nanevski
 2011 — Zarko Basevski and ZERO
 2013 — Elpida Hadzi-Vasileva
 2015 — Hristina Ivanoska, Yane Calovski (Curator: Basak Senova)
 2017 — Tome Adzievski (Curator: Branislav Sarkanjac)
 2019 — Nada Prlja (Curator: Jovanka Popova)

Northern Ireland
List of exhibitors in the Northern Ireland Pavilion:
 2005 — "The Nature of Things", group show with Patrick Bloomer, Patrick Keogh, Ian Charlesworth, Factotum, Séamus Harahan, Michael Hogg, Sandra Johnston, Mary McIntyre, Katrina Moorhead, William McKeown, Darren Murray, Aisling O'Beirn, Peter Richards and Alistair Wilson (curator: Hugh Mulholland)
 2007 — Willie Doherty (Curator: Hugh Mulholland)
 2009 — Susan MacWilliam (Curator: Karen Downey)

Pakistan
In 2019, Pakistan officially participated in the Venice Biennale for the first time.

List of exhibitors in the Pakistani Pavilion:
 2019 — Naiza Khan (Curator: Zahra Khan)

Peru
List of exhibitors in the Peruvian Pavilion:
 2015 — Raimond Chávez, Gilda Mantilla (Curator: Max Hernández-Calvo)
 2017 — Juan Javier Salazar (Curator: Rodrigo Quijano)

Philippines
List of exhibitors in the Philippines Pavilion:
 1964 — Jose Joya
 2015 — Manuel Conde, Carlos Francisco, Manny Montelibano, Jose Tence Ruiz (Curator: Patrick D. Flores)
 2017 — Manuel Ocampo, Lani Maestro (Curator: Joselina Cruz)
 2019 — Mark Justiniani (Curator: Tessa Maria Guazon)

Portugal
In 1997, Portugal announced plans to build its own pavilion; these have not materialized since.

List of exhibitors:
 1997 – Julião Sarmento
 2007 – Ângela Ferreira
 2011 – Francisco Tropa (Curator: Sergio Mah)
 2013 – Joana Vasconcelos (Curator: Miguel Amado)
 2015 – João Louro (Curator: María de Corral)
 2017 — José Pedro Croft (Curator: João Pinharanda)
 2019 — Leonor Antunes (Curator: João Ribas)

San Marino
List of exhibitors:
 1982 — Gilberto Giovagnoli, Walter Gasperoni (curated by Achille Bonito Oliva)
 2011 — Group exhibition of 13 artists, including Dorothee Albrecht, Marco Bravura, Cristian Ceccaroni, Daniela Comani, Ottavio Fabbri, Verdiano Manzi, Patrizia Merendi, Omar Paolucci, Cristina Rotondaro, Lars Teichmann, Thea Tini, Daniela Tonelli, Paola Turroni
 2015 — Group exhibition of 11 artists, including Xu De Qi, Liu Ruowang, Ma Yuan, Li Lei, Zhang Hong Mei, Eleonora Mazza, Giovanni Giulianelli, Giancarlo Frisoni, Tony Margiotta, Elisa Monaldi, Valentina Pazzini
2019 — Group exhibition of 12 artists including Gisella Battistini, Gabriele Gambuti, Giovanna Fra, Thea Tini, Chen Chengwei, Li Geng, Dario Ortiz, Tang Shuangning, Jens W. Beyrich, Xing Junqin, Xu de Qi, and Sebastián. Special Project by Martina Conti curated by Alessandro Castiglioni and Emma Zanella

Scotland
List of exhibitors in the Scottish Pavilion:
 2003 — Claire Barclay, Jim Lambie, Simon Starling
 2005 — Alex Pollard, Joanne Tatham & Tom O'Sullivan, Cathy Wilkes
 2007 — Charles Avery (artist), Henry Coombes, Louise Hopkins, Rosalind Nashashibi, Lucy Skaer, Tony Swain,
 2009 — Martin Boyce
 2011 — Karla Black
 2013 — Corin Sworn, Duncan Campbell (artist), Hayley Tompkins
 2015 — Graham Fagen
 2017 — Rachel Maclean
 2019 — Charlotte Prodger

Seychelles 
The Seychelles Pavilion was first introduced in 2015, by the proposal of artist Nitin Shroff, featuring "A Clockwork Sunset". The Pavilion was commissioned by the Seychelles Art Projects Foundation and curated by Sarah J. McDonald and Victor Schaub Wong.

List of exhibitors in the Seychelles Pavilion:
 2015 — George Camille, Leon Wilma Lois Radegonde
 2017 — Alyssa Adams, Tristan Adams, George Camille, Christine Chetty-Payet, Zoe Chong Seng, Daniel Dodin, Charle Dodo, Allen Ernest Christine Harter, Nigel Henri, Alcide Libanotis, Marc Luc, Egbert Marday, Colbert Nourrice, Leon Radegonde, Danny Sopha (Curator: Martin Kennedy)

Singapore
List of exhibitors in the Singapore Pavilion:

 2001 — Chen KeZhan, Salleh Japar, Matthew Ngui, Suzann Victor (Curators: Ahmad Mashadi and Joanna Lee)
 2003 — Heman Chong, Francis Ng, Tan Swie Hian (Curator: Low Sze Wee)
 2005 — Lim Tzay Chuen (Curator: Eugene Tan)
 2007 — Tang Da Wu, Vincent Leow, Jason Lim and Zulkifle Mahmod (Curator: Lindy Poh)
 2009 — Ming Wong (Curator: Tang Fu Kuen)
 2011 — Ho Tzu Nyen (Curator: June Yap)
 2015 — Charles Lim (Curator: Shabbir Hussain Mustafa)
 2017 — Zai Kuning (No curator)
 2019 — Ang Song-Ming (Curator: Michelle Ho)
 2022 — Shubigi Rao (Curator: Ute Meta Bauer)

Slovenia
List of exhibitors in the Slovenian Pavilion:
 2007 — Tobias Putrih
 2009 — Miha Štrukelj
 2013 — Jasmina Cibic
 2015 — Jaša Mrevlje Pollak (Curators: Michele Drascek, Aurora Fonda)
 2017 — Nika Autor (Curator: Andreja Hribernik)
 2019 — Marko Peljhan

South Africa

 1993 — Jackson Hlungwane, Sandra Kriel, Tommy Matswai (Curator: Christopher Till)
 1995 — Randolph Hartzenberg, Brett Murray (Curator: Malcolm Payne)
 2011 — Mary Sibande, Siemon Allen, Lyndi Sales (Curator: Thembinkosi Goniwe)
 2013 — Nelisiwe Xaba, Zanele Muholi, Wim Botha, Joanne Bloch, David Koloane, Gerhard Marx, Maja Marx, Philip Miller, Cameron Platter, John Muafangejo, Johannes Phokela, Andrew Putter, Alfred Martin Duggan-Cronin, Penny Siopis, Kay Hassan, Sue Williamson, Donna Kukama, Athi-Patra Ruga, James Webb, Kemang wa Lehulere, Sam Nhlengethwa (Curator: Brenton Maart)
 2015 — Willem Boshoff, Haroon Gunn-Salie, Angus Gibson, Mark Lewis, Gerald Machona, Mohau Modisakeng, Nandipha Mntambo, Brett Murray, Serge Alain Nitegeka, Jo Ratcliffe, Robin Rhode, Warrick Sony, Diane Victor, Jeremy Wafer (Curators: Christopher Till and Jeremy Rose)
 2017 — Candice Breitz, Mohau Modisakeng (Curator: Lucy MacGarry)
 2019 — Mawande Ka Zenzile, Dineo Seshee Bopape, Tracey Rose (Curators: Nkule Mabaso, Nomusa Makhubu )

Taiwan
The Taiwan Pavilion is housed in the Palazzo delle Prigioni

 2011 - Hong-Kai Wang and Yu-Hsien Su (Curated by Amy Cheng)
 2013 - Bernd Behr, Chia-Wei Hsu, Kateřina Šedá and BATEŽO MIKILU (Curated by Esther Lu)
 2015 - Wu Tien-chang
 2017 - Tehching Hsieh (Curated by Adrian Heathfield)
 2019 - Shu Lea Cheang (Curated by Paul B. Preciado)

Turkey
In 2013, Turkey signed a 20-year lease for a national pavilion at the Venice Biennale. The state-funded Istanbul Foundation for Culture and Arts is the co-ordinator of the Turkish pavilion.

List of exhibitors in the Turkish Pavilion:
 1990 — Kemal Önsoy, Mithat Şen (Curator: Beral Madra)
 1993 — Erdağ Aksel, Serhat Kiraz, Jȧrg Geismar, Adem Yilmaz (Curator: Beral Madra)
 2001 — Murat Morova, Butch Morris, Ahmet Öktem, Sermin Sherif, Xurban.net (Güven Icirlioğlu & Hakan Topal) (Curator: Beral Madra)
 2003 — Nuri Bilge Ceylan, Ergin Çavuşoğlu, Gül Ilgaz, Neriman Polat, Nazif Topçuoğlu (Curator: Beral Madra)
 2005 — Hussein Chalayan (Curator: Beral Madra)
 2007 — Hüseyin Alptekin (Curator: Vasif Kortun)
 2009 — Banu Cennetoğlu, Ahmet Öğüt (Curator: Basak Senova)
 2011 — Ayşe Erkmen (Curator: Fulya Erdemci)
 2013 — Ali Kazma (Curator: Emre Baykal)
 2015 — Sarkis (Curator: Defne Ayas)
 2017 — Cevdet Erek
 2019 — İnci Eviner (Curator: Zeynep Öz)

Tuvalu
Despite the cost to the third world country, Tuvalu decided to develop its first national pavilion in 2013 to highlight the negative effects of global warming on the nation, which is forecast to be one of the first countries to disappear due to sea level rise caused by climate change. After working closely with Taiwanese eco artist Vincent J.F. Huang at the 2012 UNFCCC COP18 session in Doha, Qatar and collaborating with the artist on several occasions, Tuvalu's government invited Huang to act as the representative artist for the pavilion. All of the artworks at the 2013 Tuvalu Pavilion focused on climate change and included In the Name of Civilization, a giant oil rig turned agent of destruction, and Prisoner's Dilemma, a depiction of the Statue of Liberty kneeling in apology to ghostly portraits of terra-cotta penguins symbolic of ecological sacrifices made to further the development of human civilization.

List of exhibitors for the Tuvalu Pavilion:
 2013 — Vincent J.F. Huang (Curators: An-Yi Pan, Li Szuhsien, Shih Shuping)
 2015 — Vincent J.F. Huang (Curator: Thomas J. Berghuis)

Ukraine
The PinchukArtCentre sponsored Ukraine's pavilions in 2007, 2009 and 2015.

List of exhibitors in the Ukrainian Pavilion:
 2005 — Mykola Babak «Your Children, Ukraine» (Curator: Oleksiy Tytarenko)
 2011 — Oksana Mas «Post-vs-Proto-Renaissance» (Curator: Oleksiy Rogotchenko)
 2013 — Ridnyi Mykola, Zinkovskyi Hamlet, Kadyrova Zhanna (Curators: Soloviov Oleksandr, Burlaka Victoria)
 2015 — Yevgenia Belorusets, Nikita Kadan, Zhanna Kadyrova, Mykola Ridnyi & Serhiy Zhadan, Artem Volokitin, Anna Zvyagintseva and Open Group (Curator: Björn Geldhof)
 2017 — Boris Mikhailov (Curator: Peter Doroshenko)

United Arab Emirates
The United Arab Emirates' Venice pavilion first opened in 2009, but 2015 was the first time an Emirati has served as curator.

List of exhibitors in the UAE Pavilion:
 2009 — Lamya Gargash (Commissioner: Dr Lamees Hamdan; Curator: Tirdad Zolghadr) 
 2011 — Abdullah Al Saadi, Sheikha Lateefa bint Maktoum, Reem Al Ghaith (Curator: Vasif Kortun)
 2013 — Mohammed Kazem (Commissioner: Dr. Lamees Hamdan; Curator: Reem Fadda)
 2015 — Hassan Sharif, Mohammed Kazem, Abdullah Al Saadi, Ahmed Al Ansari, Moosa Al Halyan, Mohammed Al Qassab, Abdul Qader Al Rais, Mohammed Abdullah Bulhiah, Salem Jawhar, Dr. Najat Makki, Abdulraheem Salim, Obaid Suroor, Dr. Mohamed Yousif, and Abdulrahman Zainal (Curator: Hoor Al Qasimi)
2017 — Nujoom Al-Ghanem, Sara Al Haddad, Vikram Divecha, Lantian Xie, Mohamed Yousif. (Curator: Hammad Nasar)
 2019 — Nujoom Al-Ghanem  (Curators: Sam Bardaouil and Till Fellrath)

Wales
The Wales pavilion was introduced in 2003.

List of exhibitors in the Wales Pavilion:
 2003 — Bethan Huws & Cerith Wyn Evans & Simon Pope Simon Pope | Art Work - About
 2005 — Peter Finnemore, Laura Ford & Paul Granjon
 2007 — Richard Deacon, Merlin James,  Heather and Ivan Morison
 2009 — John Cale
 2011 — Tim Davies
 2013 — Bedwyr Williams
 2015 — Helen Sear (Curator: Ffotogallery)
 2017 — James Richards
 2019 — Sean Edwards (Curator: Marie-Anne McQuay)

Zimbabwe
 2011 — Tapfuma Gutsa, Misheck Masamvu, Berry Bickle, Calvin Dondo (Commissioner: Doreen Sibanda; curator: Raphael Chikukwa)
 2013 — Portia Zvavahera, Michele Mathison, Rashid Jogee, Voti Thebe, Virginia Chihota (Commissioner: Doreen Sibanda; curator: Raphael Chikukwa)
 2015 — Chikonzero Chazunguza, Masimba Hwati, Gareth Nyandoro (Commissioner: Doreen Sibanda; curator: Raphael Chikukwa)
 2017 — Charles Bhebe, Admire Kamudzengerere, Sylvester Mubayi, Dana Whabira (Commissioner: Doreen Sibanda; curator: Raphael Chikukwa)
 2019 — Kudzanai-Violet Hwami, Neville Starling, Georgina Maxim, Cosmas Shiridzinomwa (Commissioner: Doreen Sibanda; curator: Raphael Chikukwa)
 2021 — Wallen Mapondera, Ronald Muchatuta, Kresiah Mukwazhi, Terrence Musekiwa (Commissioner: Raphael Chikukwa; Curator: Fadzai Veronica Muchemwa)

References

Bibliography

Further reading